AGS was a motocross bicycle manufacturer in the 1970s, featuring 50cc and 123cc engines by Sachs, Puch and Zundapp.

References

External links
 Puch-engined 123cc model
 Zundapp-engined 50cc model

Motorcycle manufacturers of the Netherlands
Dutch companies established in 1975
Vehicle manufacturing companies established in 1975